Associazione Sportiva Dilettante Modica Calcio is an Italian association football club, based in Modica, Sicily.

Modica's team colours are red and blue and it currently plays in Eccellenza Sicily.

History
The club Modica Calcio was founded in 1932 and has a long history in Italian non-league football. Modica played in Serie C2/C during the 2005–06, but was immediately relegated after playoffs and then cancelled because of financial irregularities. Successively, a new property bought Eccellenza club A.S.D. Pol. Libertas Acate from the neighbouring city of Acate; the new club, commonly referred to as Libertas Acate-Modica, won the Round B of Eccellenza Sicily league being therefore promoted to Serie D. The club was expected to reassume the original denomination from the following season, but this change was made effective only before the beginning of the 2009–10 season.

It in the season 2010–11, from Serie D group I relegated, in the play-out, to Eccellenza Sicily, where it plays in the current season.

External links
Official site

Football clubs in Italy
Football clubs in Sicily
Association football clubs established in 1932
Serie C clubs
1932 establishments in Italy